The 2014–15 North Superleague is the fourteenth staging of the North Superleague, the highest tier of league competition in the North Region of the Scottish Junior Football Association. The season began on 5 August 2014. The winners of this competition are eligible to enter the 2015–16 Scottish Cup.

Hermes won the league title on 25 April 2015.

Member clubs for the 2014–15 season
Culter were the reigning champions.

Cruden Bay and Inverness City were promoted from the North First Division (East) and (West) respectively and replace the relegated East End and Longside.

League table

Results

References

External links
 North Region JFA

6
SJFA North Region Superleague seasons